The men's 800 metres at the 2009 World Championships in Athletics was held at the Olympic Stadium on 20, 21 and 23 August.

In the first semifinals heat, Marcin Lewandowski fell over Bram Som who had tripped over Abubaker Kaki, who had fallen on his own account. After a protest, both Lewandowski and Som were allowed to compete in the final.  With the extra athletes on the track the two time qualifiers, Alfred Kirwa Yego in lane 1 and Mbulaeni Mulaudzi in lane 8, had to share their lanes with Som in 1 and Lewandowski in 8.  None of the people sharing lanes conceded space, Som leading Yego around the outside of the turn effectively boxing out Yego, Yusuf Saad Kamel and Yeimer López.  With typically slow starters Nick Symmonds and Yuriy Borzakovskiy in the middle lanes, Som had a free run from the inside but Mulaudzi, Lewandowski and Amine Laâlou a strong wave from the outside to take the lead.  Atypically, neither Symmonds nor Borzakovskiy were content to take the rear, both working their way through the crowd to join Mulaudzi at the front of the pack by the end of the first lap, exchanging arms and elbows in the process.  Lewandowski was boxed in by the action on the outside and began to fall back through the pack while Symmonds took a strong position on Mulaudzi's shoulder, Laâlou right behind Mulaudzi with Som in their wake.  Everyone held position on the backstretch save Borzakovskiy who noticeably fell back to behind Lewandowski on the back of the pack, which would be the normal place Borzakovskiy would launch his finishing kick, but not after losing so much ground.  From the back group, through the final turn, Kamel went to the outside and started passing people, followed by Yego and then Borzakovskiy doing the same thing.  Yego pulled out to lane 3 for running room, Borzakovskiy to lane 4, Kamel, Yego and Borzakovskiy, moving faster than the others ahead of them.  Symmonds held second place until Kamel passed him, then the wind went out of his sails.  Laâlou edged ahead but was getting passed by the rush.  Mulaudzi was able to lean over the line in first, falling flat on his face just past the finish line.  Yeo and Kamel crossed together with Yego getting the photo finish nod for silver.  Borzakovskiy caught everyone else but ran out of track to get into the medals.

Medalists

Records
Prior to the competition, the following records were as follows.

Qualification standards

Schedule

Results

Heats
Qualification: First 3 in each heat (Q) and the next 3 fastest (q) advance to the semi-finals.

Key:  NR = National record, Q = qualification by place in heat, q = qualification by overall place, SB = Seasonal best

Semifinals
Qualification: First 2 in each semifinal (Q) and the next 2 fastest (q) advance to the final.

X: In the first semifinals heat, Marcin Lewandowski fell over Bram Som who had tripped over Abubaker Kaki, who had fallen on his own account. After a protest, both Lewandowski and Som were allowed to compete in the final.

Final

References
General

Specific

800 metres
800 metres at the World Athletics Championships